Hell Hath No Fury is a 1991 American made-for-television thriller-drama film starring Barbara Eden and Loretta Swit about a housewife who is simultaneously framed for her husband's murder and terrorized by the deranged woman who killed him. The film was directed by Thomas J. Wright and written by Beau Bensink based on the novel Smithereens by B.W. Battin. It originally premiered on NBC Monday Night at the Movies on March 4, 1991.

Summary
Terri Ferguson (Barbara Eden) is a housewife married to well-known and respected businessman Stanley (David Ackroyd) who also has an estranged relationship with her college aged daughter Michelle (Peterson), and she's still feeling the empty nest syndrome. Terri's perfect world is shattered when her husband is brutally murdered and thus begins a terrifying ordeal where Terri finds herself the prime suspect in her husband's murder and becomes the helpless victim of Connie Stewart (Loretta Swit), a deranged woman and ex-college rival of Terri's who is the real murderer and was Stanley's ex-lover. She blames Terri for stealing Stanley away from her years ago and plots a psychotic revenge against her. Although the police are determined to convict Terri, and with no one else to turn to, she must do battle alone against Connie.

Cast
 Barbara Eden as Terri Ferguson
 Loretta Swit as Connie Stewart
 David Ackroyd as Stanley Ferguson
 Amanda Peterson as Michelle Ferguson
 Kim Zimmer as Marlene
 Richard Kline as Milton
 Stephen Lee as Bruce Gossitter
 Vernee Watson-Johnson as Tyleen
 John Marshall Jones as Johnson
 Jim Haynie as Cantrell
 Chanell Wright as Jill
 Mark Arthur Miller as Jack
 Mallory Millett as Alice
 Ellen Dostal as Mary Ann McCabe
 Natalie Core as Mrs. Stewart
 Robert Rockwell as Mr. Stewart
 Donald Craig as The Minister
 Susan Wolf as Landlady
 Rochelle Parker as The Receptionist
 Tom Durkin as Deputy
 Sam Kuglen as Desk Sergeant
 Steven A. Hite as Police Officer (uncredited)

References

External links

1991 television films
1991 films
1990s thriller drama films
American thriller drama films
NBC network original films
Films about stalking
Films shot in California
Films based on American novels
American thriller television films
American drama television films
1990s English-language films
1990s American films